The 2022–23 Utah Valley Wolverines men's basketball team represents Utah Valley University in the 2022–23 NCAA Division I men's basketball season. The Wolverines, led by fourth-year head coach Mark Madsen, play their home games at the UCCU Center in Orem, Utah, and compete as members of the Western Athletic Conference (WAC).

Previous season 
The Wolverines finished the 2021–22 season 20–12, 10–8 in Western Athletic Conference play to finish in seventh place. As the Number 7 seed in the WAC Tournament, they defeated number 10 seed Chicago State 69–47 in the first round. In the second round, UVU lost to number 6 seed Abilene Christian 74–82.

Offseason

Departures

Incoming transfers

Roster

Schedule and results 

|-
!colspan=12 style=| Non-conference regular season

|-
!colspan=12 style=| WAC regular season

|-
!colspan=9 style=|WAC tournament

|-
!colspan=9 style=| NIT

See also 

 2022–23 Utah Valley Wolverines women's basketball team

References 

Utah Valley Wolverines men's basketball seasons
Utah Valley
Utah Valley Wolverines men's basketball team
Utah Valley Wolverines men's basketball team
Utah Valley